The Marshalsea, Dublin may refer to the following defunct prisons in Dublin, Ireland:
 City Marshalsea, Dublin
 Four Courts Marshalsea
 Marshalsea of Manor of St. Sepulchre
 Marshalsea of Liberty of Thomas Court and Donore